Omar Murad (kunya 'Abu al-Majed') is a Palestinian politician. As of 2015, he was in-charge of the Syria Branch of the Popular Front for the Liberation of Palestine (PFLP).

References

Living people
Popular Front for the Liberation of Palestine members
Year of birth missing (living people)